Kyriaki Papanikolaou (born 28 February 1980) is a Greek gymnast. She competed in three events at the 1996 Summer Olympics.

References

1980 births
Living people
Greek female artistic gymnasts
Olympic gymnasts of Greece
Gymnasts at the 1996 Summer Olympics
Gymnasts from Thessaloniki